The Finnish edition of the 2009 Nordic Trophy ice hockey tournament was played between 6 August and 29 August 2009 and included only Finnish teams.

Tappara won this tournament, beating HIFK 2–0 in the final. For unexplained reasons, Kärpät and Jokerit left the tournament after the regulation round, and instead, Tappara joined the playoffs.

Participating clubs 
The Finnish edition of the 2009 Nordic Trophy featured 6 teams.

Regulation round

Standings

Games

6 August
Tappara – Jokerit 5 – 3 (0–0, 2–1, 3–2)
Kärpät – HIFK 1 – 6 (0–1, 0–1, 1–4)

7 August
Jokerit – Lukko 1 – 2 (0–1, 0–0, 1–1)

8 August
HIFK – TPS 0 – 1 SO (0–0, 0–0, 0–0, 0–0, 0–1)
Lukko – Kärpät 3 – 0 (0–0, 1–0, 2–0)

11 August
Kärpät – Tappara 5 – 4 (1–2, 2–0, 2–2)
TPS – Lukko 2 – 1

13 August
Tappara – HIFK 1 – 5 (0–2, 1–1, 0–2)
Kärpät – Jokerit 4 – 5 OT (1–0, 2–3, 1–1, 0–1)

18 August
TPS – Tappara 7 – 3 (1–2, 4–0, 2–1)
HIFK – Lukko 0 – 2 (0–1, 0–0, 0–1)

20 August
Lukko – Tappara 3 – 1 (1–0, 1–0, 1–1)
TPS – Kärpät 4 – 8 (2–3, 0–2, 2–3)
HIFK – Jokerit 4 – 2 (0–0, 1–2, 3–0)

21 August
Jokerit – TPS 3 – 2 (0–0, 2–2, 1–0)

Playoffs

28 August 
Semifinal: TPS – HIFK 2 – 6 (0–3, 1–1, 1–2)
Semifinal: Lukko – Tappara 1 – 3 (1–0, 0–2, 0–1)

29 August 
Bronze medal game: Lukko – TPS 5 – 0
Final: HIFK – Tappara 0 – 2 (0–0, 0–1, 0–1)

Final standings

References 
NordicTrophy.com

See also 
 2009 Nordic Trophy (Swedish tournament)
 2009 Nordic Trophy Junior

Nordic Trophy
Nordic